Sumiao station is a metro station that is the north terminus of Line 3 of the Wuxi Metro. It is located in Huishan District, Wuxi, Jiangsu.

References 

Wuxi Metro stations
Railway stations in Jiangsu